Zoom Tour Live was a one-off concert performed by the Electric Light Orchestra recorded originally for television, later released as a film.

History
After the release of the 2001 album Zoom, Jeff Lynne announced a North American tour, their first live set of concerts in 15 years. A promotional PBS show was recorded over two consecutive nights at CBS Television City in Los Angeles.

ELO's management abruptly cancelled the tour (due to slow ticket sales) and this footage was released on VHS and DVD by Image Entertainment. The DVD earned Platinum status in Australia and the UK.

Jeff Lynne and Richard Tandy were the only band members returning from the original incarnation of ELO.

All songs played on tour, except "Rock 'n' Roll Is King" and "All She Wanted", were released on either the Electric Light Orchestra Live album or the Zoom Tour Live VHS/DVD.

The camera coverage of ELO's comeback tour in 2001 was directed by Lawrence Jordan.

Lineup
 Jeff Lynne – vocals, lead guitar, rhythm guitar
 Richard Tandy – keyboards, synthesizer, vocoder
 Marc Mann – lead guitar, rhythm guitar, keyboards, backing vocals
 Matt Bissonette – bass guitar, backing vocals
 Gregg Bissonette – drums, backing vocals
 Peggy Baldwin – electric cello
 Sarah O'Brien – electric cello
 Rosie Vela – backing vocals

Tracks
"Do Ya"
"Evil Woman"
"Showdown"
"Strange Magic"
"Livin' Thing"
"Alright"
"Lonesome Lullaby"
"Telephone Line"
"Turn to Stone"
"Just for Love"
"Easy Money"
"Mr. Blue Sky"
"Ma-Ma-Ma Belle"
"One Summer Dream"
"Tightrope"
"State of Mind"
"Can't Get It Out of My Head"
"Moment in Paradise"
"10538 Overture"
"Ordinary Dream"
"Shine a Little Love"
"Don't Bring Me Down"
"Roll Over Beethoven" (Chuck Berry)

Certifications

References

Electric Light Orchestra video albums
2001 live albums
2001 video albums
Live video albums